The 2009 Casino Rama Curling Skins Game on TSN was held on January 10 and 11 at the Casino Rama Entertainment Centre in Rama, Ontario.  The total purse for the event was CAD$ 100,000.

Four teams were invited to participate. They played one semi-final each on January 10, and the winners played in the final on January 11.

For the first time ever, a women's team participated in this event. World Women's Champion Jennifer Jones and her team were invited.  They joined defending men's world champion, Kevin Martin, four time world champion Randy Ferbey and 2007 World Champion Glenn Howard.

Teams

Team Ferbey
Granite Curling Club, Edmonton, Alberta

Fourth: David Nedohin
Skip: Randy Ferbey
Second: Scott Pfeifer
Lead: Marcel Rocque

Team Howard
Coldwater and District Curling Club, Coldwater, Ontario

Skip: Glenn Howard
Third: Richard Hart
Second: Brent Laing
Lead: Craig Savill

Team Jones
St. Vital Curling Club, Winnipeg, Manitoba

Skip: Jennifer Jones
Third: Cathy Overton-Clapham
Second: Jill Officer
Lead: Dawn Askin

Team Martin
Saville Sports Centre, Edmonton, Alberta

Skip: Kevin Martin
Third: John Morris
Second: Marc Kennedy
Lead: Ben Hebert

Draw to the button
Team Howard won the draw to the button contest to determine seeding. This awarded them an extra $1000.

Games
Semi-final dollar amounts
1st & 2nd end: $1000
3rd & 4th end: $1500
5th end: $2000
6th end: $3000
7th end: $4500
8th end: $6500

Ferbey vs. Martin
January 10, 1:00pm EST

Jones vs. Howard
January 10, 7:00pm EST

Final
January 11, 1:00pm EST

Final game dollar amounts
1st & 2nd end: $2000
3rd & 4th end: $3000
5th end: $4000
6th end: $6000
7th end: $9000
8th end: $13000
+ $15000 bonus for the winner

Casino Rama Curling Skins Game, 2009
TSN Skins Game
2009 in Ontario
Curling in Ontario